Nicholas M. Kiefer (born February 28, 1951) is an Economics professor at Cornell University.  He received a fellowship award from the John Simon Guggenheim Memorial Foundation in 1986 for his "past achievements and ... promise of future accomplishments".

Kiefer is the author of graduate textbooks and monographs in econometrics, including textbooks on job-search econometrics (Empirical Labor Economics: The Search Approach with T. J. Devine and Search Models and Applied Labor Economics with G.R. Neumann). He wrote a textbook on the micro-econometrics of agents solving dynamic problems (Economic Modeling and Inference with B. J. Christensen).

References

External links
 Cornell University's description of Professor Nicholas Kiefer

21st-century American economists
1951 births
Living people
Princeton University alumni
Cornell University faculty
Fellows of the Econometric Society